The K XIV-class submarine was a class of five submarines, built for the Royal Netherlands Navy. Used for patrols in the Dutch colonial waters. The class comprised K XIV, K XV, K XVI, K XVII and K XVIII. Three of the five ships were lost in World War II

Design
The K XIV-class submarines were the last designs of J.J. van der Struyff, a submarine designer and engineer of the Royal Netherlands Navy. The submarines of the K XIV-class were fully riveted and their pressure hull were made of 14 mm thick steel. To increase their seaworthiness the pressure hull was plated with 3 mm thick steel. As a consequence the K XVII was 200 ton heavier than the submarines in the previous class, the K XI-class submarines. However, this did allow the submarines of the K XIV-class to dive as deep as 80 to 100 meters, while withstanding the enormous water pressure. Between the plating and the pressure hull there was room for the ballast tanks, fuel tanks, anchor, torpedo tubes and more.

Furthermore, the submarines were divided into six compartments. The first compartment at the front contained a room with four torpedo launchers which were loaded during wartime, while there were also four reserve torpedoes stored. The room also acted at the same time as sleeping accommodation, galley and mess for the crew. In the second and third compartment the batteries were stored, and also contained the sleeping accommodation for officers. The fourth compartment was the nerve center of the K XIV-class submarines, since this was the place where all control panels, instruments and command tower were located. The command tower was made of thick and pressure-resistant steel. The fifth compartment contained the machine chamber and thus the diesel motor. The sixth, and last, compartment was located at the back and had two torpedo launchers and the electric motor. There was also space for two reserve torpedoes. The  torpedo tubes of the K XIV-class submarines had a width of 53 cm. To enter the submarines six water resistant shutters were built.

Construction
The ships were built by two different shipyards. K XIV, K XV and K XVI were built by R.D.M, Rotterdam and K XVII and K XVIII at Fijenoord shipyard also in Rotterdam.

References

Footnotes

External links
Description of class